Kalabahi is a town on Alor Island and it is the capital of Alor Regency in East Nusa Tenggara province of Indonesia. The town possesses the only puskesmas available in the district, in west Kalabahi.

It covers 4 kelurahan (villages) of the Teluk Mutiara District.

Transportation
The town is served by Alor Island Airport.

Climate
Kalabahi has a tropical monsoon climate (Am) with long dry season and short wet season.

References

Populated places in East Nusa Tenggara
Regency seats of East Nusa Tenggara
Alor Archipelago